Rimantas (shortened as Rimas) is a masculine Lithuanian given name. The feminine form of the name is Rimantė. Notable people with the name include:

Rimantas Astrauskas (b. 1955), physicist, ecologist, and signatory of the 1990 Act 
Rimantas Jonas Dagys (born  1957),  Lithuanian chemist and politician, member of Seimas (1992–1996, 1996–2000), since 2008 minister
Rimantas Dichavičius (born 1937), Lithuanian photographer 
Rimantas Driežis (born 1959),  Lithuanian painter 
Rimantas Dūda (born 1953),  Lithuanian painter 
Rimantas Grigas (born 1962), Lithuanian basketball coach, currently signed with Žalgiris Kaunas 
Rimantas Kaukėnas (born  1977),  Lithuanian basketballplayer 
Rimantas Sakalauskas (b. 1951),  Lithuanian sculptor and a recipient of the Lithuanian National Prize 
Rimantas Antanas Stankevičius (1944–1990), cosmonaut
Rimantas Šidlauskas (born  1962), diplomat, ambassador 
Rimantas Šulskis (1943–1995), Lithuanian sculptor and painter 
Rimantas Taraškevičius (b. 1949),  politician, mayor of Klaipėda 
Rimantas Žvingilas (born  1973),  Lithuanian international football striker

Lithuanian masculine given names